Trelawney was launched in 1808 at Whitehaven as a West Indiaman. She was wrecked on 11 March 1822.

Career
Trelawney first appeared in Lloyd's Register (LR) in 1808.

Although Lloyd's Register did not specify where Trelawney was sailing, Lloyd's Lists ship arrival and departure data showed that she was trading with the West Indies, particularly Jamaica. In 1808 she arrived back at Liverpool from Jamaica with a cargo sugar, rum, cotton, coffee, sweatmeats, staves, and lime juice.

Loss
Trelawney, M'Iver, master, of Whitehaven, was totally lost on 11 March 1822 during a severe gale at Montego Bay, Jamaica.

Citations
Citations

1808 ships
Age of Sail merchant ships of England
Maritime incidents in March 1822